Ferch may refer to:

Place:
Ferch, Brandenburg, village in the German state of Brandenburg

Surname:
Heino Ferch (born 1963), award-winning German film and television actor
John Arthur Ferch (born 1936), United States diplomat

In Welsh names, meaning "daughter [of]", as in:
Alys ferch Owain Glyndŵr, daughter of Owain Glyndŵr, who led a revolt in Wales between 1400 and c.1416 against King Henry IV of England
Branwen ferch Llŷr, legendary tale from medieval Welsh literature and the second of the four branches of the Mabinogi
Catrin ferch Owain Glyndŵr (died 1413), one of the daughters of Margaret Hanmer and Owain Glyndŵr
Elen ferch Llywelyn (1206–1253), daughter of Llywelyn the Great of Gwynedd by Lady Joan, daughter of King John of England
Gwenllian ferch Gruffydd (1097–1136), Princess Consort of Deheubarth in Wales, and married to Gruffydd ap Rhys, Prince of Deheubarth
Gwladys ferch Dafydd, the daughter of Dafydd ap Gruffudd, the last Welsh Prince of Wales, and Elizabeth Ferrers
Marged ferch Ifan (1696–1793), a harpist and wrestler
Nest ferch Cadell, the daughter of the 8th century King of Powys, wife of Merfyn Frych, King of Gwynedd and mother to Rhodri the Great
Nest ferch Rhys (died 1136), Welsh princess of Deheubarth who was renowned for her beauty